Isostenosmylus bifurcatus is a species of neotropical osmylid.

References

Neuroptera